The CL class is a class of diesel locomotives built by Clyde Engineering, Granville for the Commonwealth Railways in several batches between 1970 and 1972.
The class was the last in the world to be built with the Electro-Motive Diesel bulldog nose but differed from previous builds in having a mansard roof.

Construction

In 1968, Commonwealth Railways placed an order for five 2237 kW locomotives with Clyde Engineering to operate services on the Trans-Australian Railway from Port Pirie to Kalgoorlie. They were mechanically similar to the Western Australian L class of 1967. The initial design was to have a Do-Do wheel arrangement and a USA style EMD FP45 cab. This was later changed to a streamlined carbody and conventional Co-Co wheel arrangement.

History
The first locomotive was completed in January 1970, with two further orders resulting in 17 locomotives being built with the last delivered in October 1972. Their operating sphere was extended through to Perth on Indian Pacific services and for a time in the 1970s they operated through to Lithgow, New South Wales. In July 1975, all were included in the transfer of Commonwealth Railways to Australian National. The CLs began to operate to Alice Springs and Adelaide when these were converted to standard gauge in 1980 and 1983. In 2004, they began to operate to Darwin following this line opening.

Remanufacturing
In August 1992, Australian National awarded Morrison Knudsen Australia a contract to remanufacture the CLs at its Whyalla factory. As part of the deal, Morrison Knudsen purchased the locomotives and leased them back to Australian National for 12 years. Seven were rebuilt as CLFs to operate freight services and ten as CLPs with head end power to operate the Indian Pacific, Ghan, and Overland passenger services.

The rebuilding involved stripping back to the frame, with everything except for the nose section and monocoque frame removed. Changes included the EMD 645E3 engines being replaced with overhauled EMD 645E3C engines imported from Morrison Knudsen in the US, the original main alternators were rebuilt from AR10/A4-D14 to the AR10/A9-D14 type, refurbished D78 traction motors replaced the originals along with a new gear ratio, and new MK-LOC microprocessor controls were fitted. The cab was upgraded to modern standards, the brake setup was also changed from twin to single shoe per wheel, and a number of other small changes were made to assist maintenance.

After rebuilding, the locomotives did not retain their numbers, for example, the first locomotive converted was CL2 which emerged as CLF1. All were back in service by the end of 1993. The CLFs appeared in the standard Australian National green with yellow data panel, strip and B-end. The CLPs received a unique livery, with a lighter green nose, silver carbody, and a yellow stripe running from the nose to the rear.

In 1994, Australian National's interstate services were transferred to National Rail. The lease with Morrison Knudsen meant the locomotives could only be used on Australian National trains, or a higher lease fee would apply. As a result, the class were not seen on National Rail operated trains, and did not venture onto the wider national standard gauge network until Australian National won hook and pull contracts for private operator SCT Logistics.

From January 1994, CLPs began operating the Indian Pacific from Sydney to Perth, previously New South Wales and Western Australia used their own locomotives on the train when within their state borders. On conversion to standard gauge in 1995, The Overland was also hauled by CLPs. The use of the CLPs on passenger trains came to an end in November 1997, when the passenger operations of Australian National were sold to Great Southern Rail, who contracted National Rail to haul their trains.

CLP15 was involved in the Mount Christie head-on collision in February 1997, being stored for several months before scrapping in November the same year.

Private ownership
In November 1997, the CL class were sold to Australian Southern Railroad with Australian National's remaining freight operations. With the splitting up of the Australian Railroad Group in June 2006, ten went to QR National (now known as Aurizon) and five to Geneese & Wyoming Australia (now One Rail Australia).

In mid-2017, a fund-raising campaign was started with the aim of purchasing CLP10 from Apex International and restoring it externally to its as-built condition as CL17. On 21 June 2018, it was announced that the campaign had been successful in raising the $150,000 required to purchase the locomotive for preservation.

In mid 2019, it was revealed that Southern Shorthaul Railroad (SSR) had purchased 4 locomotives from the Apex group. These included CLF1, CLF3, CLP9 & CLP12, with 2204 (ex NSWGR 422 class locomotive 42216) also included in the sale. The locomotives were transferred from Goulburn to Cootamundra for reactivation with CLP12 trialing in April 2020. CLF3 was next, entering service soon after. CLF1 was repainted into SSR yellow and black at Seymour during July and August 2020, and soon after was fitted with an ICE radio and approved as a leading unit. In February 2021 CLF3 received an ICE radio and also approved as a leading unit. One Rail Australia reactivated CLP8 in March 2021, with CLP16 following in September 2022 after an electrical fire in May 2020. CLP12 received an ICE radio in June 2021 to enable it to lead services on the ARTC and John Holland networks.

Class list

References

Notes

Bibliography

External links

Clyde Engineering locomotives
Co-Co locomotives
Commonwealth Railways diesel locomotives
Railway locomotives introduced in 1970
Standard gauge locomotives of Australia
Diesel-electric locomotives of Australia
Aurizon diesel locomotives
Streamlined diesel locomotives